Husaibah Al Sharqiah is a city in the Al Anbar province of Iraq.

Populated places in Al Anbar Governorate